Amanda Elliott (born 1 November 1989) is a British tennis player.

Elliott has won 4 doubles titles on the ITF tour in her career. On 24 November 2008, she reached her best singles ranking of world number 311. On 4 May 2009, she peaked at world number 251 in the doubles rankings.

Elliott made her WTA main draw debut at the 2008 Banka Koper Slovenia Open in the doubles event partnering Han Xinyun.

Elliott competed in the Ladies Singles Qualifying event at The Championships, Wimbledon in 2008 and 2009, and competed in the Ladies Doubles event at The Championships, Wimbledon in 2008 and 2009, partnering Katie O'Brien and Elena Baltacha respectively. In 2008, Amanda Elliott and Katie O'Brien lost in the first round to Aiko Nakamura and Aravane Rezai 7–5, 6–4, and in 2009 Amanda Elliott and Elena Baltacha lost in the first round to Victoria Azarenka and Elena Vesnina 6–0, 6–4.

Since retiring from full time tennis, Elliott continues to have success with tennis, having recently won the Loughborough Tennis Alumni Event partnering Anne Meredith in the Ladies event and David Scales in the mixed.

Personal life

Following tennis Amanda studied at Loughborough University where she achieved a 1st Class honours.

Elliott now works for Bjorn Borg as the UK Marketing Manager and travels throughout Europe with work.

ITF finals (4–6)

Singles (0–1)

Doubles (4–5)

References

External links 
 
 
 

1989 births
Living people
British female tennis players
English female tennis players
Tennis people from Hertfordshire
21st-century British women